New Salem is a small unincorporated community in the southern most corner of Dade County, Georgia, United States.  It is part of the Chattanooga, TN–GA Metropolitan Statistical Area. The community surrounds the historical New Salem School.

Geography 
New Salem  is located in the northwestern part of Georgia, it borders Alabama state line. Chattanooga is approximately 33 miles from the New Salem community. Trenton is 20 miles from the community. Scottsboro, Alabama is about 43 miles away.

See also 

 National Register of Historic Places listings in Dade County, Georgia
 Northwest Georgia Joint Development Authority
 Town Line, New York, seceded from the United States (unrecognized) and rejoined in 1946.

References

External links 

 Dade County historical marker

Populated places in Dade County, Georgia